Otago Harbour is the natural harbour of Dunedin, New Zealand, consisting of a long, much-indented stretch of generally navigable water separating the Otago Peninsula from the mainland. They join at its southwest end,  from the harbour mouth. It is home to Dunedin's two port facilities, Port Chalmers (half way along the harbour) and at Dunedin's wharf (at the harbour's end). The harbour has been of significant economic importance for approximately 700 years, as a sheltered harbour and fishery, then deep water port.

Geography
The harbour was formed from the drowned remnants of the giant Dunedin Volcano, centred close to what is now Port Chalmers. The remains of this violent origin can be seen in the basalt of the surrounding hills. The last eruptive phase ended some ten million years ago, leaving the prominent peak of Mount Cargill. The ancient and modern channel runs along the western side of the harbour, the eastern side being shallow, with large sandbanks exposed at low tide. Two islands form a line between Port Chalmers and Portobello half way along the harbour—Goat Island / Rakiriri and Quarantine Island/Kamau Taurua. The nearby smaller island known as Pudding Island (Titeremoana) lies close to the Peninsula shore and can be reached by foot at low tide. The Water of Leith flows into the harbour at its southern end, which along with numerous streams lower the salinity of the harbour water.

Biology

Seabirds

Similar to the Otago Peninsula, the harbour water is known for various rare wildlife. The area is the home of many species of wading birds. Other bird species which visit the harbour include two species of penguins, little penguin and famous yellow-eyed penguins. Taiaroa Head, at the tip of the Otago Peninsula, is home to the northern royal albatrosses only "mainland" colony in the world.

Marine mammals

The bay and peninsula provides a critical habitat for Hooker's sea lions and New Zealand fur seal. Southern elephant and leopard seals are occasional visitors into the harbour. In total, four species of pinnipeds, and at least nine or more species of cetaceans are known to inhabit or migrate through the area.

The outer peninsula or adjacent to Taiaroa Head is one of three main congregating areas for dusky dolphin in New Zealand waters and the harbor and peninsula hosts important areas for breeding and nursing. Bottlenose dolphins and critically endangered, endemic Hector's dolphins also frequent the water. Other species such as common dolphins and orcas can visit the harbour entrance where orcas and dusky dolphins have been seen interacting without violence. Southern right whales historically frequented inside the entrance of the harbour possibly up to Quarantine and Goat Island / Rakiriris, They used the shallow, calm water for nursing calves before commercial whaling wiped them out. The number of humpback whales visiting the peninsula have increased as this species recovers much faster than the southern rights. There have also been observations of blue whales, minke whales, and long-finned pilot whales.

History 

Māori first arrived at Otago Harbour in the 1300s, soon after they first settled in New Zealand. Being too far south for the cultivation of sweet potato they adopted a hunter gather society. This initially involved sealing and fishing the harbour, drifting more towards the latter as seal stocks diminished. This time in the history of the harbour is recorded in place names such as Kamau Taurua (Quarantine Island), which means "a place where nets are set".

The first European ships

Captain Cook never entered Otago Harbour, but speculated that it existed when he was off the Pacific coast in 1770. It is not known exactly when the first Europeans (likely sealers) entered the harbour, however Māori oral tradition puts it some time 'long before' 1810. Written records of this time are restricted to a handful of journals and newspaper accounts of sailors who only stayed briefly. George Bass made the Dunedin end of the harbour the north east limit of his proposed fishing monopoly in 1803. The American ship Favourite with its supercargo Daniel Whitney may have called in the summer of 1805 to 1806. Daniel Cooper, master of the London sealer Unity   probably did call in the summer of 1808 to 1809 when his Chief Officer, Charles Hooper, probably gave his name to Hooper's Inlet on the Otago Peninsula. William Tucker (1784–1817) was with a gang employed by Robert Campbell, a Sydney merchant, dropped on islands off the Dunedin coast in November 1809 and with another man, Daniel Wilson, was at Otago Harbour on 3 May 1810 when Robert Mason, master of the Brothers, anchored in the harbour and picked him up. This is the first, explicit and identifiable reference to a European ship in the Otago Harbour. The court record containing it, made in 1810, refers to the harbour as 'Port Daniel', a name which stayed in use for some years.

The sealers and whalers

Another English sealer, the Sydney Cove, Captain Charles McLaren, was anchored in the harbour late in 1810 when Te Wahia's theft of a knife, a red shirt and some other articles sparked what has been called "The Sealers' War"-he 'War of the Shirt'.

A much-discussed affray in that conflict occurred after James Kelly of Hobart anchored the Sophia in the harbour in December 1817 with William Tucker on board. After a visit to nearby Whareakeake (Murdering Beach) where Tucker had been living since 1815 and where he and two other men were now killed Kelly took revenge on Māori on his ship in the harbour, including a chief Korako. He then burnt a harbourside village,'the beautiful City of Otago', probably on Te Rauone Beach and certainly not at Whareakeake as has often been suggested.

A peace was concluded in 1823 and on 17 July of that year John Rodolphus Kent of the Naval cutter Mermaid from New South Wales, while in the harbour, took 'the liberty of naming it (as it has not hitherto been named) "Port Oxley", in honour of the Surveyor General of the Colony' in fact John Oxley (1783/85?–1828). As noted, it had already been named. In 1826 Thomas Shepherd, one of a party of intending colonists, explored the site of Dunedin and left the oldest surviving pictures of the harbour and nearby coast, now in the Mitchell Library Sydney.

From its origins as a secret sealers' haven Otago Harbour developed into a busy international whaling port after the Weller brothers established their whaling station at Te Umu Kuri, Wellers Rock, at what is now called Otakou in November 1831. The busiest whaling port south of the Bay of Islands, it was also the hub of the largest European population in New Zealand after the Bay of Islands/Hokianga district by the end of 1839. By that time whaling had collapsed and Dumont D'Urville and his officers, visiting in 1840, observed the port had become the centre of a riotous trade in liquor and prostitution. This continued until the Scottish settlers arrived in 1848 and made Port Chalmers and Dunedin the new population centres on the harbour.

Harbour developments and alterations

While Otago Harbour might have the appearance of an excellent deep-water port, it was not naturally suited to such a role, especially in the early days of settlement when ships needed to dock close to the city. The flat land at the southern end of the harbour and close to the isthmus of Otago Peninsula was ideally suited for a city (and was the site for Dunedin), but the harbour itself could naturally accommodate deep-drafted ships only as far as Port Chalmers. At Port Chalmers, two islands (Quarantine Island/Kamau Taurua and Goat Island / Rakiriri) almost bisect the harbour. Beyond them, the harbour is shallow and silty, and mudflats are often visible at low tide. In 1946 Otakou Fisheries was started based out of the township of the same name on the eastern side of the harbour. This was later to become a major part of the Otago fishing industry.

As the city grew, and particularly with the increase in commerce that developed following the Otago Gold Rush of the 1860s, it became desirable to provide a means for ships to reach the city's wharves. Though a contentious and expensive decision, it was agreed to dredge a channel along the northwestern side of the harbour. The channel was finally opened on 30 December 1881. The initial channel was narrow and shallow, and did not get off to an auspicious start, as the Union Steam Ship Company's SS Penguin, the first ship to use it, was temporarily grounded while using it. The channel was officially named the Victoria Channel by Keith Ramsay, chairman of the Otago Harbour Board. A significant area at the head of the harbour has been reclaimed since the founding of Dunedin, primarily for industrial use. Smaller portions have also been reclaimed at a number of places around the harbour, including Port Chalmers, Macandrew Bay, and Broad Bay.

As finance allowed, the channel was gradually widened and deepened, and by 1907, twice as many ships were using Dunedin's wharves as used Port Chalmers. It was only with the advent of Port Chalmers' container port in the early 1970s that the Victoria Channel again became quiet. The channel is maintained by Port Otago Ltd, who keep it dredged to a depth of eight metres, allowing ships of up to 40,000 tonnes deadweight to travel up the harbour to Dunedin. Much of the channel's larger traffic in the early 21st century is oil transport to Dunedin city and chemicals and fertiliser to and from Ravensbourne's fertiliser works.

Aramoana at the harbour mouth has twice been projected as the site for New Zealand's second aluminium smelter. The proposals, in the mid-1970s and early 1980s, were abandoned after major public protest. The harbour is tidal, shallow and seldom rough and for that reason is popular for water sports such as yachting and windsurfing.

Infrastructure and transport 
Substantial container port facilities exist at Port Chalmers,  along the western shore from the harbour mouth. A channel along the western side of the harbour is regularly dredged, allowing vessels with a draught of 12.5 m to Port Chalmers, and 8 m all the way to the heart of Dunedin. New Zealand's frozen meat export trade was inaugurated at Port Chalmers in 1882. Portobello is home to one of New Zealand's leading marine research establishments, the Portobello Marine Laboratory, a department of the University of Otago. This lies at the harbour's edge on the tip of a small arm of the Otago Peninsula, the Portobello Peninsula. There are currently numerous sightseeing and fishing boats that can be chartered and one scheduled ferry from Port Chalmers to Portobello.

Notable ships

Harbourside settlements

The settlements of Otago Harbour clock wise from the harbour mouth.

Gallery
Category:Otago Harbour on Wikimedia Commons

References

External links

 Coasts and Harbours at the Otago Regional Council

Landforms of Otago
Geography of Otago
Geography of Dunedin
Otago Peninsula
Ports and harbours of New Zealand
Shield volcanoes of New Zealand
Calderas of New Zealand
Submarine calderas
Miocene volcanoes
Extinct volcanoes
Polygenetic shield volcanoes